Yeojin Jeon, formerly known as Ji-ae Jeon, (born January 8, 1984) is a South Korean actress most well known for her role as Lee Kang-hyun in the popular 2006 Korean TV drama Princess Hours.

Filmography

TV shows

References

External links 
 Jeon Ji-ae at HanCinema

1984 births
Living people
South Korean film actresses
South Korean television actresses
21st-century South Korean actresses